Tim Kish (born July 1, 1954) is a retired American football coach. Kish previously served as the defensive coordinator and linebackers coach at the University of Arizona before being promoted to interim head coach upon the firing of head coach Mike Stoops on October 10, 2011. He was succeeded as Arizona's head coach by Rich Rodriguez. Prior to his retirement at the end of the 2018 season, Kish served as linebackers coach for seven seasons at the University of Oklahoma.

Coaching career
Kish was hired as Arizona's linebackers coach when Stoops was made head coach. He served in that capacity for three seasons until being promoted to assistant coach. In 2010, he was made co-defensive coordinator with Greg Brown and was made the sole defensive coordinator in 2011 when Brown left to take the same position at Colorado. After a 1–5 start to the season which extended Arizona's losing streak against FBS programs to ten games (the one win came against FCS Northern Arizona) Stoops was fired and Kish was promoted to interim head coach. In his first game as interim head coach, the Wildcats defeated UCLA, 48–12, 355 days after their last win over an FBS opponent, which also came against UCLA. Kish would lose the next three games on the schedule but closed out the conference slate by defeating the rival Arizona State Sun Devils in Tempe, reclaiming the Territorial Cup in the 85th Duel in the Desert. Two days later, Rich Rodriguez was named Arizona's new full-time head coach. Kish would finish the season with a 45-37 victory over Louisiana-Lafayette in his final game as head coach.

Kish was not retained on Rodriguez' new staff and was succeeded as defensive coordinator and linebackers coach by Jeff Casteel.

Head coaching record

Notes

References

1954 births
Living people
American football defensive backs
Arizona Wildcats football coaches
Army Black Knights football coaches
Ball State Cardinals football coaches
Bowling Green Falcons football coaches
Illinois Fighting Illini football coaches
Indiana Hoosiers football coaches
Northwestern Wildcats football coaches
Ohio Bobcats football coaches
Oklahoma Sooners football coaches
Otterbein Cardinals football players
Purdue Boilermakers football coaches
High school football coaches in Ohio
People from Westerville, Ohio
Coaches of American football from Ohio
Players of American football from Ohio